Angelo Ingrassia (March 23, 1923 – March 21, 2013) was an American jurist.

Ingrassia served in the United States Army during World War II. He received his law degree from Albany Law School and was admitted to the New York bar. He served as district attorney of Orange County, New York and then as judge of the Orange County court. In 1982, he was elected to the New York Supreme Court, serving until his retirement in 1999.

Notes

1923 births
2013 deaths
Albany Law School alumni
New York Supreme Court Justices
People from Middletown, Orange County, New York
20th-century American judges
United States Army personnel of World War II